This is a comparison of road signs in countries and regions that speak majorly English, including major ones where it is an official language and widely understood (and as a lingua franca).

Among the countries listed below, Liberia, Nigeria, and the Philippines have ratified the Vienna Convention on Road Signs and Signals, while the United Kingdom has signed the convention but not yet ratified it. Botswana, Eswatini, Lesotho, Malawi, South Africa, Tanzania, Zambia, and Zimbabwe are all Southern African Development Community (SADC) members who drive on the left and use the SADC Road Traffic Signs Manual. The Manual on Uniform Traffic Control Devices (MUTCD) used in the United States has also influenced signing practices in other countries.

Differences between traffic signs in English-speaking countries/regions

Differences in units 

 All main countries/regions, except for the United States and the United Kingdom, use the metric system. Some mark this fact by using units on various signs.  Note that some smaller English-speaking countries in the Caribbean also use miles per hour.
 Ireland, parts of Canada (British Columbia, parts of Ontario, and Yukon), and Liberia list units (km/h) on their maximum speed limit signs. In Canada and Ireland, this is a reflection of (somewhat) recent transitions from Imperial to metric.
 Advisory speed limit signs in most countries list units, although New Zealand does not. The US lists units in mph.
 Height, weight, and width restrictions are almost always accompanied by units (tonnes or metres); in the US, the short ton is used with no distinction from metric tonnes.
 Signs in some parts of Canada near the US border often include both metric and Imperial units, to remind American drivers that they are entering metric countries. No such equivalent exists in the US.
 The US was, at one time, planning a transition to the metric system. The Metric Conversion Act of 1975 started the process, but the abolition of the United States Metric Board in 1982 significantly hampered conversion. Nevertheless, the MUTCD specifies metric versions of speed limit signs. Furthermore, Interstate 19 in Arizona is partially signed in metric.

Color differences

Warning signs 

 Most warning signs are diamond-shaped and yellow or red-bordered triangular warning signs; some warning signs may be fluorescent yellow-green in order to draw extra attention. There are a few exceptions to this:
 Pentagonal signs are used in school zones in the United States, Liberia, and many areas in Canada.  In the Philippines, pentagonal signs are permanently used for pedestrian crossings.
 Warning signs may be text-only.

Road works and construction 
 Most countries use orange or yellow diamond-shaped signs or yellow, orange or white red-bordered triangular warning signs for construction zones. Australia and the Philippines use rectangular signs that fit into temporary casings.

Regulatory signs 
 Prohibitory and restrictive signs are classified as regulatory signs.
 Almost all prohibitory signs use a red circle with a slash. Restrictive signs typically use a red circle, as in Europe. Some may be seated on a rectangular white background.
 The original MUTCD prohibitory and restrictive signs were text-only (i.e. NO LEFT TURN). Some of these signs continue to be used in the US.
 Yield signs can be blank or have text with the legend "YIELD" or "GIVE WAY" depending on which country it is.
 The No Entry / Do Not Enter sign may or may not feature text. In Ireland, an upwards-pointing arrow contained within a slashed red circle is used instead. Some countries have those two signs separated.
 The Latin American-style do not proceed straight sign may take a different meaning in countries with standard No Entry signs. Typically, it indicates an intersection where traffic cannot continue straight ahead, but where cross-traffic may enter the street from the right (or left). Thus, it is distinguished from a No Entry (for all vehicles) sign.

Mandatory or permitted-action signs 

 The design of mandatory signs varies widely, since the MUTCD does not specify their use. Rather, the MUTCD's equivalent are classified as regulatory signs.
 Some countries use simple arrows with the text "ONLY" or its equivalent underneath. This is the US and Australian standard.
 Some countries use European-style white-on-blue circular signs. These are "Type A Mandatory Signs" as prescribed by the Vienna Convention.
 Some Latin American countries use red-bordered circular signs, in the same style as regulatory signs. These are "Type B Mandatory Signs" as prescribed by the Vienna Convention. In cases relating to particular types of vehicle traffic (e.g. buses), these signs are identical to some European prohibitory signs.
 Canada uses a unique style of mandatory sign that features a green circle.

Table

Warning

Regulatory

Priority

Prohibitory signs

Mandatory or permitted actions 
Mandatory signs indicating an obligation to turn left do exist, but are not included in the list below since they are functionally mirror versions of signs indicating an obligation to turn right.

Other

See also 

 Comparison of European road signs
 Comparison of MUTCD-influenced traffic signs
 Glossary of road transport terms
 Manual on Uniform Traffic Control Devices
 Traffic sign
 Vienna Convention on Road Signs and Signals

Notes

References 

English-speaking countries
Comparisons